The Review of Higher Education is an academic journal founded in 1978 and the official journal of the Association for the Study of Higher Education. The publication is aimed at scholars, educators, and policymakers and includes articles, essays, reviews, and research intended to better inform readers of the issues that affect higher education today.

The journal is published quarterly in September, December, March, and June by the Johns Hopkins University Press. Circulation is 2,058 and the average length of an issue is 104 pages.

See also
Post-secondary education

External links
Official website
The Review of Higher Education  at Project MUSE
Association for the Study of Higher Education

Education journals
Publications established in 1978
English-language journals
Johns Hopkins University Press academic journals
Quarterly journals